The Cheetahmen is a video game series created by Active Enterprises featuring three anthropomorphic cheetahs. It was introduced in 1991, as part of the Action 52 multi-game cartridge for the NES. It is notable for its main theme, as it was later used as the music for the first level in Cat Mario, as well as its extremely low quality, often being cited as one of the worst video games of all time. The Cheetahmen also appear in an unpublished sequel for the NES (Cheetahmen II), and an obscure Sega Genesis title that was simply called "The Cheetahmen". Cheetahmen III was in development in 1994 for a prototype handheld console by Active Enterprises but is now considered vaporware.

It was likely made to be a franchise similar to ones such as Kevin Eastman and Peter Laird's Teenage Mutant Ninja Turtles, which it shares similar elements with; namely, the protagonists being mutated animals named after famous gods in Greek mythology, like how the latter has mutated turtles named after Italian renaissance artists. However, due to Active Enterprises closing in 1994, nothing else came of the name beyond three games that were planned for the series, with the third one being on a new console called the Action Gamemaster.

Plot

A man called the "Action Gamemaster" is depicted in the first Cheetahmen game's intro sequence, which serves as a framing device. The man is shown playing a video game when he is abruptly pulled into his television by a robotic arm and meets the Cheetahmen. He is never referred to again during the game or in subsequent Cheetahmen titles, although the manual implies that he transforms into the characters, one after another.

A backstory is provided in a comic book that was included with the Action 52 NES cartridge. A mad scientist named Dr. Morbis kills a mother cheetah while on a safari in Africa and takes its three cubs to his laboratory. Subjected to genetic experimentation, the cubs transform into human-cheetah hybrids who eventually turn on Dr. Morbis after gaining awareness of his true nature and future plans. Dr. Morbis responds by creating an army of various human-animal hybrids (known as "Sub-Humans") to counter the threat posed by the self-aware Cheetahmen. Dr. Morbis does not appear during gameplay, though other villains from the comic book do appear. The Genesis game provides a slightly different premise where the Cheetamen must rescue cheetah cubs from Dr. Morbis.

Characters

The playable characters included a trio of the titular Cheetahmen:
Apollo – Named after Apollo, an ancient Greek god. As his name may suggest, this character is an archer and a scholar versed in many academic fields. He uses a crossbow in combat. As the leader of the Cheetahmen, he was the first to question Dr. Morbis' intentions.
Hercules - Named after Heracles, an ancient Greek demigod. This character fights with his bare hands, as his mythological namesake did not use a weapon.
Aries - Named after Ares, the ancient Greek god of war. This character acquired the expertise for fighting with dual wooden clubs by watching movies about martial arts shown to him, by Dr. Morbis.

The enemies included:
 Dr. Morbis – a malevolent scientific expert in the field of genetic engineering. His ultimate goals are never made clear.
 Cygore – a cyborg with a robotic arm. In marketing materials, he was depicted with a number of weapon-based attachments that were never used in the games, including a hammer and buzzsaw.
 Sub-Humans – Animals with human qualities, that were experiments created by Dr. Morbis.
 White Rhino – an anthropomorphic rhinoceros, one of the "Sub-Humans" created by Dr. Morbis.
 Scavenger – an anthropomorphic vulture, one of the "Sub-Humans" created by Dr. Morbis.
 Hyena – an anthropomorphic hyena, one of the "Sub-Humans" created by Dr. Morbis.
 Ape-Man – a chimpanzee-human hybrid, allegedly the most powerful of Dr. Morbis' "Sub-Humans".

Video games

Cheetahmen
The initial game of this franchise was included on the Action 52 multi-game cartridge for the NES. It was inconsistently titled "Cheetah Men", "Cheetahmen", "Cheetamen", and "The Cheetahmen" within the game selection screen, title screen, and marketing materials. Gameplay consists of six levels, two for each of the three Cheetahmen. The second level includes a boss battle. Most of in-game enemies are characters from the other games of the Action 52 cartridge, including Satan Hosain parody of Iraqi dictator Saddam Hussein.

Cheetahmen II
There were plans for a sequel, Cheetahmen II, but was not completed (6 of 10 proposed levels were made) and was never officially released. In 1996, however, 1,500 copies of the game were found located in a warehouse in Florida and eventually put on sale on the secondary market. All copies of the game were reused Action 52 cartridges, some with a small gold sticker reading "". This cartridge is now very rare and hard to find.

In Cheetahmen II, the player again assumes the role of one of the three Cheetahmen (Aries, Apollo and Hercules); after defeating a boss at the end of the second level, they switch to the next Cheetahman for the following two levels, as in the Action 52 version. Due to a bug, it is impossible to get to the levels in which one plays Cheetahman Aries without altering the ROM image or experiencing a glitch that very rarely starts the game on these two levels.

A patch fixing all the game-breaking bugs was made freely available by romhacking.net member PacoChan in July 2011. Subsequently, a "fixed" version of the game titled Cheetahmen II: The Lost Levels was developed by Greg Pabich. The new version of the game was released on an actual NES cartridge and was intended to fix the fourth level end glitch found in the original game. To fund the game, Pabich started a Kickstarter program in which donors would be given rewards depending on the amount of money pledged. The program started on August 6, 2012, and lasted until September 6. To tie in with the project, a short video was shot with the Angry Video Game Nerd, Pat the NES Punk, The Game Chasers, and Pabich himself advertising the game.

Cheetahmen III
A third game in the series, Cheetahmen III, was in development exclusively for the Action Gamemaster, a handheld multi-cartridge and CD-ROM clone console also being developed by Active Enterprises named after the intro character of the same name announced at the 1994's Consumer Electronics Show. The system was to have been in the sense of Nintendo's Game Boy and the Atari Lynx, but with much greater aspirations. It would have featured compatibility with the NES, Sega Genesis and SNES cartridge games, as well as CD-ROM games, via separate modules that would be interchangeable with the system and were to retail individually despite concerns of the system being too large and cumbersome to handle. Features would have included a 3.2" color LCD screen, CD player, TV tuner, built-in battery charger, and a cigarette-lighter adapter for cars. Both the game and console are vaporware, with no official word on their cancellation, likely due to Active closing their doors to the gaming market entirely that same year.

References

External links
 Site for cheetahmengames.com
 Kickstarter campaign for Cheetahmen II: The Lost Levels

Nintendo Entertainment System games
Sega Genesis games
Fictional cats
Superhero video games
Unauthorized video games
Video games about cats
Video games about video games
Video games developed in the United States
Video game superheroes